Xu Yi (died c. 219), courtesy name Jicai, was a strict official trusted by the warlord Cao Cao to look after the capital Ye, in the late Eastern Han Dynasty of China

Life and career 
Xu Yi was born in Dongguan in Langye commandery, present day Yishui in Shandong. In the 190's as the land plunged into civil war, Xu Yi fled across the Jiang river but when the young local warlord Sun Ce sought to recruit him, Xu Yi changed his name and fled back home in disguise. He later joined the staff of Cao Cao, the Minister of Works, (putting it sometime between 196 and 208) and controller of the Han Emperor. Later he accompanied the now Chancellor Cao Cao in the 211 campaign against Ma Chao and the Liang warlords who had risen up for fear Cao Cao was intending to attack. After Cao Cao's victory, there were concerns that the Land Within the Passes (the territory around the Western Han Dynasty capital Chang'an) was unsettled and not yet secure so Xu Yi was made Chief Clerk and placed in Chang'an to help secure the area. Earning praise there, Xu Yi was promoted to Inspector of Yong. When Cao Cao became Duke of Wei in 213, Xu Yi was recalled to Cao Cao's capital and joined his Secretariat as a Master of Writing.

Over time, Xu Yi became an enemy of the powerful official Ding Yi and despite advice to show him respect, refused to defer to Ding Yi and made no response to his accusations as he was confident Cao Cao would see through Ding Yi's attempts against him and in his own abilities to protect himself. Influential Attendant Huan Jie acted to protect Xu Yi and in 216 Cao Cao moved Xu Yi away from his court position as Junior Clerk in the Department of the East, leading Cao Wei and Jin commentator Fu Xuan to remark that Cao Cao showed limits to his wisdom as, due to Ding Yi's influence, he had turned against two good officials: demoting Xu Yi and forcing the death of senior official Cui Yan. However, though Xu Yi was moved out of Ye itself, his new appointment to the post of Administrator of Wei, given it covered Cao Cao's capital of Ye and his ducal seat, was still a position of some trust and import. The next year when Cao Cao went to attack Sun Quan at Ruxu he made Xu Yi Chief Clerk and had him look after his capital at Ye while Cao Cao was away on camapign. Cao Cao praised Xu Yi's loyalty and integrity, knowing he could trust his affairs to Xu Yi's hands but urged him to be less strict, Xu Yi would later rise to head the Secretariat.

In 219 Xu Yi went west with Cao Cao as part of an army to reinforce the defenders at Hanzhong against the future Shu Han Emperor Liu Bei's attack but news reached Cao Cao of the well connected Wei Feng's failed plot back in Ye. Yang Jun as Commandant of the Capital began an investigation, drawing up a list of punishments and impeached himself, Cao Pi displeased with Yang Jun for taking matters into his own hands had Yang Jun moved to Pingyuan meaning a replacement was required back in Ye. Cao Cao sighed that he had nobody in Ye who could have discovered Wei Feng's plan (the plot leaked due to Chen Yi, a senior member of the plot, getting nervous and informing Cao Pi). Huan Jie recommended Xu Yi and Cao Cao hand wrote an order for Xu Yi to go to Ye to be the new Commandant. However, after several months Xu Yi became badly ill and resigned. He was appointed to the court in a consultant role but died soon after.

When Cao Pi became King after the death of his father, he rewarded families of dead officers like Xu Yi in memory of their loyal service  and since Xu Yi had no son, he gave position to Xu Tong, son of a cousin, and had Xu Tong continue Xu Yi's line. Cao Pi as Emperor of the new Cao Wei dynasty is said to have regularly sighed during meetings with his ministers and reflected approvingly on Xu Yi's conduct.

References 

 Chen, Shou (3rd century). Records of the Three Kingdoms (Sanguozhi).
 Pei, Songzhi (5th century). Annotations to Records of the Three Kingdoms (Sanguozhi zhu)
Officials under Cao Cao
219 deaths
Year of birth unknown
Year of death uncertain